Picoplatin is a platinum-based antineoplastic agent in clinical development by Poniard Pharmaceuticals (previously NeoRx) for the treatment of patients with solid tumors.

In Phase I and Phase II clinical trials, picoplatin demonstrated activity in a variety of solid tumors, including lung, ovarian, colorectal and hormone-refractory prostate cancer.  However, in Phase III trials, picoplatin failed to hit its primary endpoint for advanced small cell lung cancer.  Hopes are now pinned on its use for metastatic colorectal cancer.

References 

Platinum(II) compounds
Organochlorides
Pyridines
Platinum-based antineoplastic agents